The discography of Above & Beyond, a British progressive trance group, consists of five studio albums, three remix albums, two compilation albums, twenty-six mix albums, two extended plays and eighty-five singles.

Above & Beyond's first artist album, Tri-State, was released in March 2006, along with the single "Alone Tonight." The album features collaborations with the likes of Zoë Johnston, Richard Bedford, and Andy Moor, known for his work with Tilt and as one-half of the duo Leama & Moor. The first single from the album, "Air for Life," was released in July 2005. In July 2008, Above & Beyond released the album Sirens of the Sea under the artist name OceanLab, one of Above & Beyond's side projects. In July 2009, they then released a remix album of Sirens of the Sea, titled Sirens of the Sea Remixed. Above & Beyond released their second album titled Group Therapy on 6 June 2011. The first single from this album was "Sun & Moon," featuring the vocals of Richard Bedford. Above & Beyond released their Acoustic album on 28 January 2014. The group's third artist album, We Are All We Need, was released on 19 January 2015. This was followed by the release of their fourth studio album, Common Ground, on 16 January 2018. The group then released Flow State on 19 July 2019, an ambient album mainly aimed towards yoga and meditative events.

Albums

Studio albums

As OceanLab

Acoustic albums

Ambient albums

Notes

Soundtrack albums

Remix albums

Compilation albums

Mix albums
Anjunabeats releases
 2003 – Anjunabeats Volume One
 2004 – Anjunabeats Volume Two
 2005 – Anjunabeats Volume Three
 2006 – Anjunabeats Volume Four
 2007 – Anjunabeats Volume Five
 2008 – Anjunabeats Volume Six
 2008 – Anjunabeats 100 + From Goa to Rio
 2009 – Anjunabeats Volume 7
 2010 – Anjunabeats Volume 8
 2011 – 10 Years of Anjunabeats
 2011 – Anjunabeats Volume 9
 2013 – Anjunabeats Volume 10
 2014 – Anjunabeats Volume 11
 2015 – Anjunabeats Volume 12
 2017 – Anjunabeats Volume 13
 2018 - Acoustic - Live At The Hollywood Bowl
 2019 – Anjunabeats Volume 14
 2020 - Anjunabeats Volume 15
 2022 – Anjunabeats Volume 16

Anjunadeep releases
 2009 – Anjunadeep:01 (Mixed by Above & Beyond)

Other
 2004 – Laser-Kissed Trance (Mixmag)
 2009 – Trance Nation (Ministry of Sound)
 2010 – AX Music Series Volume 15 - Mixed by Above & Beyond: Utopia (Armani Exchange Music Series)
 2011 – Cream Ibiza Sunrise (Mixmag)
 2012 – Cream Ibiza (New State Music)
 2012 – United Colours of Anjunabeats (Mixmag)

Extended plays

Singles

Other certified songs

Remixes

as Above & Beyond
 2000 – Chakra - Home (Above & Beyond Mix)
 2000 – Aurora - Ordinary World (Above & Beyond Remix)
 2000 – Fragma - Everytime You Need Me (Above & Beyond Remix)
 2000 – Adamski - In The City (Above & Beyond Mix)
 2001 – OceanLab - Clear Blue Water (Above and Beyond Progressive Mix)
 2001 – Tranquility Base - Razorfish (Above & Beyond Bangin Mix)
 2001 – Armin van Buuren presents Perpetuous Dreamer - The Sound Of Goodbye (Above & Beyond Remix)
 2001 – Anjunabeats - Volume One (Above & Beyond Remix)
 2001 – Ayumi Hamasaki - M (Above & Beyond Remix)
 2001 – The Mystery - Mystery (Above & Beyond Remix)
 2001 – Three Drives On A Vinyl - Sunset On Ibiza (Above & Beyond Remix)
 2001 – Dario G - Dream To Me (Above & Beyond Mix)
 2001 – Delerium - Underwater (Above & Beyond's 21st Century Mix)
 2001 – Madonna - What It Feels Like For A Girl (Above & Beyond 12" Club Mix)
 2002 – Catch - Walk On Water (Above & Beyond Remix)
 2002 – Every Little Thing - Face The Change (Dirt Devils and Above & Beyond Remix)
 2002 – Vivian Green - Emotional Rollercoaster (Above & Beyond Mix)
 2003 – Billie Ray Martin - Honey (Above & Beyond Club Mix)
 2003 – Rollerball - Albinoni (Above & Beyond Remix)
 2003 – Motorcycle - As The Rush Comes (Above & Beyond's Dynaglide Mix)
 2003 – Tomcraft - Loneliness (Above & Beyond Remix)
 2003 – Exile - Your Eyes Only (Aimai Naboku Rinkan) (Above & Beyond Mix)
 2003 – Matt Hardwick and Smith & Pledger - Day One (Above & Beyond's Big Room Mix)
 2003 – Rusch & Murray - Epic (Above & Beyond Remix)
 2003 – Madonna - Nobody Knows Me (Above & Beyond 12" Mix)
 2003 – OceanLab - Satellite (Original Above & Beyond Mix)
 2004 – Britney Spears - Everytime (Above & Beyond Club Mix)
 2004 – Chakra - I Am (Above & Beyond Mix)
 2004 – Dido - Sand In My Shoes (Above & Beyond's UV Mix)
 2004 – Delerium - Silence (Above & Beyond's 21st Century Remix)
 2005 – Ferry Corsten and Shelley Harland - Holding On (Above & Beyond Remix)
 2006 – Cara Dillon and 2Devine - Black Is The Colour (Above & Beyond's Divine Intervention Remix)
 2007 – Adam Nickey - Never Gone (Original Mix) (Above & Beyond Respray)
 2007 – DT8 Project - Destination (Above & Beyond Remix)
 2007 – Purple Mood - One Night In Tokyo (Above & Beyond Remix)
 2008 – Radiohead - Reckoner (Above & Beyond Remix)
 2008 – OceanLab - Sirens Of The Sea (Above & Beyond Club Mix)
 2008 – OceanLab - Miracle (Above & Beyond Club Mix)
 2009 – Dirty Vegas - Tonight (Above & Beyond Remix)
 2010 – Miguel Bose - Por Ti (Above & Beyond Remix)
 2012 – Kaskade featuring Skylar Grey - Room For Happiness (Above & Beyond Remix)
 2014 – Faithless - Salva Mea 2.0 (Above & Beyond Remix)
 2015 – Same K - For You (Above & Beyond Edit)
 2015 – Jean-Michel Jarre and Tangerine Dream - Zero Gravity (Above & Beyond Remix)
 2016 – Moby - Porcelain (Above & Beyond Remix)
 2017 – Above & Beyond featuring Zoë Johnston - No One On Earth (Gabriel & Dresden Remix) [Above & Beyond Respray]
 2017 – Gabriel & Dresden featuring Sub Teal - This Love Kills Me (Gabriel & Dresden Club Mix - Above & Beyond Respray)
 2019 – Above & Beyond - Alone Tonight (Above & Beyond's Gorge Update)
 2020 – Fatum, Genix, Jaytech and Judah - We're All In This Together (Above & Beyond Respray)

as Dirt Devils
 2000 – Free State - Different Ways (Dirt Devils Remix)
 2000 – The Croydon Dub Heads - Your Lying (Dirt Devils Remix)
 2001 – Free State - Release (Dirt Devils Remix)
 2001 – Anjunabeats - Volume One (Free State and Dirt Devils Remix)
 2002 – Modulation - Darkstar (Dirt Devils Remix)
 2002 – Every Little Thing   - Face The Change (Dirt Devils and Above & Beyond Remix)
 2002 – Day After Tomorrow - Faraway (Dirt Devils 12" Mix)
 2002 – Matt Cassar presents Most Wanted - Seven Days And One Week (Dirt Devils Mix)
 2002 – Future Breeze - Temple Of Dreams (Dirt Devils Remix)
 2003 – Ayumi Hamasaki - Voyage (Dirt Devils Remix)

as Free State
 2000 – 4 Strings - Day Time (Free State Vocal Mix)
 2000 – Icebreaker International - Port of Yokohama (The Free State YFZ Mix)
 2000 – The Croydon Dub Heads - Your Lying (Free State Remix)
 2001 – Anjunabeats - Volume One (Free State and Dirt Devils Remix)

as "OceanLab"
 2001 – Teaser - When Love Breaks Down (OceanLab Mix)
 2002 – Ascension - For a Lifetime (OceanLab Remix)

References

Electronic music group discographies
Discographies of British artists